The House of Commons Standing Committee on Access to Information, Privacy and Ethics (ETHI) is a standing committee of the House of Commons of Canada. The committee was conceived during the first session of the 38th Parliament and held its first meeting in October 2004.

Mandate
Reporting to the Parliament of Canada on issues related to ethics and privacy
Reviewing amendments to the Lobbying Act, the Conflict of Interest Act and the Access to Information Act
studying the reports of the Information Commissioner of Canada, the Privacy Commissioner of Canada, the Conflict of Interest and Ethics Commissioner, and the Commissioner of Lobbying Canada.

Work
The committee has undertaken numerous studies over the years on topics related to information sharing, national security and privacy such as Information Sharing with the United States and Privacy in Canadian Airports. The committee has also reviewed various pieces of legislation such as the Privacy Act and created corresponding reports with recommendations and amendments. For example, the committee's 2016 Protecting the Privacy of Canadians: Review of the Privacy Act report included twenty eight recommendations to facilitate modernization of the act to account for legislative and technological changes that have occurred since the original Privacy Act was enacted.

Membership
as of February 13, 2022

Subcommittees
Subcommittee on Agenda and Procedure (SETH)

References

Standing Committee on Access to Information, Privacy and Ethics (ETHI)

Ethics organizations
Access